The European Union Agency for the Cooperation of Energy Regulators (ACER) is an Agency of the European Union created under the terms of the Third Energy Package of 2009. It was established in 2010 and has its seat in Ljubljana, Slovenia.

The basis for the establishment of ACER is Regulation 713/2009 of the European Parliament and the Council of 13 July 2009. The regulation describes the establishment and the legal status, tasks, organisation, and financial provisions.

ACER is the second intergovernmental organization headquartered in Slovenia. The first was the International Center for Promotion of Enterprises (ICPE).

Tasks 
The Agency:
 complements and coordinates the work of national regulatory authorities,
 participates in the creation of European network rules,
 takes, under certain conditions, binding individual decisions on terms and conditions for access and operational security for cross border infrastructure,
 gives advice on various energy-related issues to the European institutions, and
 monitors and reports developments at the European energy markets, primarily on the framework of the Regulation on Wholesale Energy Market Integrity and Transparency (REMIT)

The Agency updated its REMIT guidance in May 2021.

See also 
 Energy Community
 European Network of Transmission System Operators for Electricity (ENTSO-E)
 European Network of Transmission System Operators for Gas (ENTSOG)
 Council of European Energy Regulators (CEER)
 European Regulators' Group for Electricity and Gas (ERGEG)

References

External links 
 The Agency Website
REMIT Portal

Electric power in the European Union
Electricity authorities
2010 in the European Union
Agencies of the European Union
Organizations based in Ljubljana
Government agencies established in 2010
2010 establishments in Slovenia